Ferrari Driver Academy is an initiative from Formula One team Scuderia Ferrari to promote young talent inside its own organisation, with several drivers being selected and funded by the team, being under long-term contracts. Some notable former members include, Charles Leclerc,  Sergio Pérez, Lance Stroll, and Mick Schumacher.

History 
The idea of the concept came from Felipe Massa's grooming within the Ferrari organisation, with the Brazilian being loaned out to Sauber for three seasons whilst being under contract with Ferrari. Jules Bianchi became the first recruit to the scheme in December 2009, being followed by Mirko Bortolotti, Daniel Zampieri and Raffaele Marciello in March 2010. In late 2010, Ferrari confirmed Sergio Pérez had been signed up to the scheme, the Mexican being set to be its first graduate to Formula One competition, having already signed for Ferrari-powered Sauber days before the announcement. Bianchi also ceased being a member in July 2015 after dying from injuries he sustained at the 2014 Japanese Grand Prix while racing for the Ferrari-powered Marussia team. Lance Stroll ceased being a member following his departure to Williams. Marciello ceased to be a member for personal reasons.

After rumours of the academy being disbanded, it was announced that the programme would be expanded with Massimo Rivola as its new head. On 23 June 2015, Antonio Fuoco had his first Formula One test with Ferrari during the 2-day post-Austrian Grand Prix test in Spielberg at the Red Bull Ring. In March 2016, it was announced that Charles Leclerc would be inducted into the Ferrari Driver Academy. In November of that year, Enzo Fittipaldi was among five drivers invited to join the Ferrari Driver Academy and was confirmed as a Ferrari Driver Academy member alongside Marcus Armstrong the following month. In late 2017 Ferrari added Callum Ilott, Robert Shwartzman and Gianluca Petecof to their line-up. Mick Schumacher, the son of multiple Formula One World champion Michael Schumacher was added to the lineup in 2019.

In September 2018, it was announced Leclerc would become the first academy member to graduate to Ferrari in 2019.

Mick Schumacher graduated to F1 with Haas F1 after winning the 2020 Formula 2 Championship, while Championship runner-up Callum Ilott was given a test and reserve driver role at Scuderia Ferrari. After 2020 three drivers left the academy: Giuliano Alesi, Enzo Fittipaldi and reigning Formula Regional European Champion Gianluca Petecof, meanwhile Australian karter James Wharton joined it after winning the Ferrari Scouting competition.

In January 2021, Maya Weug, 16, became the first female driver to join the academy. In Autumn of 2021 Ferrari added European Karting vice-champion Rafael Câmara and Italian F4 and ADAC F4 champion Ollie Bearman to their lineup, after the pair won the Ferrari's Scouting World Final.

Following the second running of the Girls On Track – Rising Stars competition Laura Camps Torras was signed to the setup.

Current drivers

FDA Esports Team

Former drivers 

 Championship titles highlighted in bold.

Former FDA Esports drivers

Esports 
In 2019 Ferrari established the FDA Esports Team to compete in the Formula One Esports Series. Their first championship victory came that same year, with Italian David Tonizza winning the drivers' championship.

In 2020, Enzo Bonito and Filip Prešnajder joined the team. A much harder season was to come, with Ferrari only taking 2 wins in the season, both achieved by Tonizza.

In 2021 two-time Esports champion Brendon Leigh joined the team from Mercedes to partner Tonizza. They finished 4th in the teams' championship on 125 points with 1 win and 2 podiums, both from Tonizza.

In 2022 Fabrizio Donoso swapped with Presnajder from Alpine to join Leigh and Tonizza at Ferrari. They endured their worst season to date, with only one podium from Leigh and ending up 7th in the team standings.

Complete F1 Esports Series results

See also 
Scuderia Ferrari
Formula Abarth
Formula Future Fiat

Notes

References

External links 
 

Ferrari in motorsport
Racing schools
Sports organizations established in 2009